WMGI, "100.7 Mix FM", is an FM radio station owned by Midwest Communications, Inc. in Terre Haute, Indiana. The station operates on the FM radio frequency of 100.7 MHz, FM channel 264. The studios are located at 925 Wabash Avenue in Terre Haute.

History
On December 31, 1994, WMGI dropped soft adult contemporary for country music as "Highway 101", but listeners reacted negatively to what turned out to be a stunt. WMGI then switched to Top 40 as "100.7 Mix FM", with Beau Richards as program director and morning co-host; the first song was "What Is Love" by Haddaway. Ratings doubled and WMGI was second to WTHI-FM. In fact, WMGI had over 70 percent of teenagers. Tom Watson consulted the change. WMGI was the first station to have Kato Kaelin as a guest, on April Fool's Day, at a time when he was still testifying in the O.J. Simpson trial.

References

External links

MGI
Contemporary hit radio stations in the United States
Midwest Communications radio stations